Carenza may refer to

Given name
Carenza, a medieval Occitan composer
Carenza Lewis (born 1963), English archaeologist

Surname
Chris Carenza (born 1952), American soccer player 
Joe Carenza Sr. (died 1981), American soccer player 
John Carenza (born 1950), American soccer player
Ranieri Carenza (born 1963), an Italian long-distance runner

See also
Karenza (disambiguation)
Charenza